Diana Simmonds (born 1953) is an Australian journalist and arts critic, currently the editor and proprietor of Stagenoise.com.

Simmonds was born in London, England in 1953 and moved with her family to Kenya. She returned to London in 1977 and wrote for various magazines including Time Out and was a founder member of the cooperative City Limits. In 1985 she moved to Sydney, Australia and wrote for the Sydney Morning Herald, The Bulletin, The Australian and the Sunday Telegraph, where she was the arts editor. In 2008 she was appointed editor of Sydney Alumni Magazine, for the University of Sydney. She has also written several novels and non-fiction books, including one on Princess Diana and one on Doris Day, and continues to write as a freelance journalist from time to time.

In 2006 she co-founded the Sydney Theatre Reviewers and began working with brothers Damian and Tim Madden to create Stagenoise, an Australian theatre review site.

Bibliography

Books
 Silver Lining (romance novel): Bella Books, 2013. 
 To Hell in a Handcart: A Rollercoaster Ride Through the Psyche of Modern Australia : Hachette Livre, 2005.  
 Diana the Hunted: A Modern Media Tragedy : Pluto Press, 2004.  
 Squidgie Dearest: The Making of a Media Goddess Australia's Love Affair with Princess Diana : Pluto Press, 2002. 
 Forty Love (romance novel): Naiad Press, 1997. 
 Heart on Fire (romance novel): Naiad Press, 1996. 
 Being Whitefella, ed. Duncan Graham (Fremantle 1994) "Sixteen 'whitefellas' explore their relationship with Aboriginal Australia" – including Bruce Petty, Fred Chaney, Ted Egan, Kim Beazley, Veronica Brady, Robert Juniper and Judith Wright.
 A Star is Torn'' (about musical theatre production of the same name) (with Robyn Archer): Virago, 1986. 
 "Princess Di the National Dish - the making of a Media Superstar": Pluto Press, 1984.

Other Works
 "https://www.westernsydney.edu.au/__data/assets/pdf_file/0010/1492165/ALUM3340_GradLife_Summer_v08_web2.pdf" page 26

References

1953 births
Living people
Australian freelance journalists
Australian theatre critics
Australian women journalists
Women theatre critics